In mathematics, a Metzler matrix is a matrix in which all the off-diagonal components are nonnegative (equal to or greater than zero):

 

It is named after the American economist Lloyd Metzler.

Metzler matrices appear in stability analysis of time delayed differential equations and positive linear dynamical systems. Their properties can be derived by applying the properties of  nonnegative matrices to matrices of the form M + aI, where M is a Metzler matrix.

Definition and terminology 
In mathematics, especially linear algebra, a matrix is called Metzler, quasipositive (or quasi-positive) or essentially nonnegative if all of its elements are non-negative except for those on the main diagonal, which are unconstrained. That is, a Metzler matrix is any matrix A which satisfies

Metzler matrices are also sometimes referred to as -matrices, as a Z-matrix is equivalent to a negated quasipositive matrix.

Properties 
The exponential of a Metzler (or quasipositive) matrix is a nonnegative matrix because of the corresponding property for the exponential of a nonnegative matrix.  This is natural, once one observes that the generator matrices of continuous-time finite-state Markov processes are always Metzler matrices, and that probability distributions are always non-negative.

A Metzler matrix has an eigenvector in the nonnegative orthant because of the corresponding property for nonnegative matrices.

Relevant theorems 
 Perron–Frobenius theorem

See also 

 Nonnegative matrices
 Delay differential equation
 M-matrix
 P-matrix
 Z-matrix
 Hurwitz matrix

 Stochastic matrix
 Positive systems

Bibliography 

 

Matrices